Katberg is a hamlet high up in Raymond Mhlaba Municipality, Amathole District Municipality, in the Eastern Cape province of South Africa.

References

Populated places in the Raymond Mhlaba Local Municipality
Tourist attractions in the Eastern Cape